The Huaiyu Mountains are a mountain range located in the prefecture of Yushan County, Jiangxi, China. One of its most famous mountains is Mount Sanqing.

References 

 Mount Sanqingshan National Park

Mountain ranges of Jiangxi